Joëlle Pineau (born 1974) is a Canadian computer scientist and associate professor at McGill University. She is the lead of Facebook's Artificial Intelligence Research lab (FAIR) in Montreal, Quebec.

Early life and education 
Pineau was born in Ottawa, Ontario. She played violin in the Ottawa Symphony Orchestra.  She eventually studied engineering at the University of Waterloo. She completed her postgraduate education in robotics at Carnegie Mellon University in 2004. A chapter of Pineau's Masters thesis, Point-based value iteration: An anytime algorithm for POMDPs, has been published and cited almost 1,000 times. Her doctoral thesis, Tractable Planning Under Uncertainty: Exploiting Structure, was supervised by Sebastian Thrun and Geoff Gordon.

Research and career
Pineau develops algorithms and models that allow learning in partially complex domains. She is co-director of McGill University's Reasoning and Learning Lab. She founded two start-ups that develop robotic assistants for the elderly; the SmartWheeler initiative and the Nursebot platform. SmartWheeler is a multi-modal wheelchair that combines artificial intelligence and robotics.

She is a Fellow of the Association for the Advancement of Artificial Intelligence (AAAI) and a Senior Fellow of the Canadian Institute for Advanced Research. In 2016 she was inducted into the Royal Society of Canada College of New Scholars, Artists and Scientists. Pineau investigates approaches to personal medicine, using data from medical charts, X-ray images, clinical notes and lab reports to generate new treatment strategies. She teaches Artificial intelligence how to analyse medical scans. Her team have used Deep learning for detecting seizures. She serves as an editor of the Journal of Artificial Intelligence Research (JAIR) and the Journal of Machine Learning Research (JMLR). She has given lectures for the Artificial Intelligence Channel.

In 2017 Pineau was appointed the head of the Facebook AI Research Lab in Montreal. She won a Facebook Research Award. She spoke at the third annual Canada 2020 conference. Here she focuses on reinforcement learning, deep learning, computer vision and video understanding. In 2018 she won the Natural Sciences and Engineering Research Council E.W.R. Steacie Memorial Fellowship. She challenges Artificial intelligence research that is not reproducible. She is president of the International Machine Learning Society. In 2019, Pineau received a Governor General's Innovation Award for her leadership in the innovative applications of artificial intelligence and machine learning to the field of personalized medicine.

References 

Artificial intelligence researchers
1974 births
Canadian women computer scientists
Canadian computer scientists
Carnegie Mellon University alumni
University of Waterloo alumni
Academic staff of McGill University
Fellows of the Association for the Advancement of Artificial Intelligence
Facebook employees
Living people
Date of birth missing (living people)
People from Ottawa